Mojtaba Haghdoust is an Iranian football midfielder who currently plays for Iranian football club Zob Ahan in the Persian Gulf Pro League.

Club career

Naft Tehran
Haghdoust joined Naft Tehran in summer 2015. He made his professional debut for Naft Tehran in fixture XI of 2015–16 Iran Pro League against Esteghlal Khuzestan as a substitute for Arash Rezavand while he made an appearance against Diana Baghershahr on October 9, 2015.

Club career statistics

References

External links
 Mojtaba Haghdoust at IranLeague.ir

Living people
1996 births
Iranian footballers
Naft Tehran F.C. players
Esteghlal F.C. players
Sportspeople from Khuzestan province
Association football midfielders
21st-century Iranian people